Jonny Hepworth (born ) is an English rugby league and rugby union footballer. He played club level rugby union (RU) for Leinster Rugby, Clontarf FC, Leeds Tykes, and, Rotherham R.U.F.C., and club level rugby league (RL) for Castleford Panthers ARLFC, Leeds Rhinos, London Broncos, Castleford Tigers (Heritage No. 799) and Featherstone Rovers.

He was born in Castleford. He currently plays for the Featherstone Rovers. Hepworth previously played for the Leeds Tykes, making his début for them at Headingley Carnegie Stadium against London Welsh on 3 September 2006 at the start of the 2006–07 National League 1 season.

He states his best teammate was Keiran Hickman.

Leeds Rhinos
Hepworth played junior rugby league for the Castleford Panthers ARLFC before joining Super League outfit Leeds Rhinos.

He made only one appearance for the Rhinos, under coach Daryl Powell, before briefly joining the London Broncos on loan in 2002 and his hometown club the Castleford Tigers, also on loan, in 2003. Broncos coach Tony Rea said on the arrival of Hepworth in May 2002: "He's an exciting young player and will give us some nice back-up."
In 2011 he signed for Championship side the Featherstone Rovers becoming a key figure in their side.

Castleford Tigers
His move to Castleford Tigers was made permanent but when they were relegated from the Super League. In 2004 he switched codes and signed for Celtic League side Leinster, making six appearances and scoring one try.

During his brief stint at the Castleford Tigers he was compared to Sean Long of St. Helens with his then coach Graham Steadman saying in April 2004: "I would compare Jonny Hepworth with the likes of Sean Long. He's got similar attributes, he's pacy, he has a quality kicking game and he supports well. What he lacks at the moment is that self-confidence and belief to take a game by the scruff of the neck.

"He is in on merit because he is good enough and he's got to believe that. Obviously he's got to get game time and, on the back of that, the experience and confidence will come. He's got a great attitude and is certainly making good progress."

Hepworth captained the Leeds Rhinos Academy team when they beat local rivals the Bradford Bulls U-19 side in the Senior Academy Championship with a 12–7 victory in a brilliant Grand Final at Headingley in October 2002.

He commented after the game: "We've worked hard all season and it's just what we wanted. They gave us everything in the first half and then we piled on the pressure and eventually got there. It was probably the biggest game of my life and it was great."

Leinster
Before making his full début for Leinster against Edinburgh in Dublin on 6 November 2005 he said:  "Apart from playing for a local team in Wakefield when I was 15, coming on against Bath was my first competitive game. But I think I've adapted well and fitted in well here."

"I'm picking up bits as we go along and settling in well, hopefully I can make a full début today and show what I can do."

"If I was switching to be a union forward it'd be difficult, but as a utility back in league you can fit in more quickly. In league there's not much kicking, it's mainly just torpedo kicks when you're punting."

"But here everyone can kick and our coach David Knox has been helping me out with that."

He also featured for Clontarf in North Dublin. He then signed for the Leeds Tykes, joining up again with Daryl Powell, the Leeds Tykes' first team coach.

Hepworth joined the Rotherham R.U.F.C. for the 2010–11 RFU Championship, and made an immediate impression with his pace in possession and tenacious defence.

References

External links
(archived by web.archive.org) Profile at featherstonerovers.net
Statistics at thecastlefordtigers.co.uk
Profile on Leeds Tykes website
(archived by web.archive.org) Profile on Sky Sports
Leinster unveil new players and new European home
Statistics at espnscrum.com
(archived by web.archive.org) Profile at leedsrugby
Fourie scoops awards double at Leeds Carnegie
Rotherham 24 Leeds Carnegie 41
Leeds Carnegie v Worcester Warriors, Sunday 25 April, kick off 3pm
Jonny Hepworth's Leeds Carnegie future in balance
Search for "Jonny Hepworth" at bbc.co.uk

1982 births
Living people
Castleford Tigers players
Clontarf FC players
English rugby league players
English rugby union players
Featherstone Rovers players
Leeds Rhinos players
Leeds Tykes players
Leinster Rugby players
London Broncos players
Rotherham Titans players
Rugby league fullbacks
Rugby league players from Castleford
Rugby union players from Castleford